Aphelida is a phylum of Fungi that appears to be the sister to true fungi.

Taxonomy
 Phylum Aphelidiomycota Tedersoo 2018 [Aphelida Karpov, Aleoshin & Mikhailov 2014]
 Class Aphelidiomycetes Tedersoo 2018 [Aphelidea Gromov 2000]
 Order Aphelidiales Tedersoo et al. 2018 [Aphelidida Gromov 2000 non Cavalier-Smith 2012]
 Family Aphelididae Gromov 2000 [Amoeboaphelidiidae Cavalier-Smith 2012]
 Genus Amoeboaphelidium Scherffel 1925 emend. Karpov 2014
Genus Paraphelidium Karpov, Moreira & Lopez-Garcia 2017
Genus Pseudaphelidium Schweikert & Schnepf 1996
 Genus Aphelidium Zopf 1885 emend. Gromov 2000

References 

 
Opisthokont phyla